Ilai ( Leaf) is a 2017 Indian Tamil-language drama film written and directed by Bineesh Raj. Swathy Narayanan features in the lead role, while Sujith Stephanos, King Mohan and Biju Raj among others play supporting roles. The film began production during early 2016 and was released on 21 April 2017.

Cast
Swathy Narayanan as Ilai
Sujith Stephanos
Jenhhish
King Mohan
Sreedevi Anil
Sivakumar Kurukkal
Biju Raj

Production
The film began production in late 2015, with actress Swathy Narayanan partaking in a photo shoot for the project in December 2015. Playing the title role of Ilai, the film marked Swathy's first film in the Tamil film industry, after she had previously appeared in Malayalam films including Vasanthiyum Lakshmiyum Pinne Njaanum (1999) and Su.. Su... Sudhi Vathmeekam (2015). Along with Swathy, Malayalam actress Sreedevi Anil and Kannada actor King Mohan were also selected to star in the film. The film was set in the remote villages of Tamil Nadu in the early 1991, talking about the importance of education for young girls. The director, Bineesh Raj, also doubled up as the film's VFX artist.

Release
The film opened on 21 April 2017 across Tamil Nadu alongside Marx's Nagarvalam. The Times of India wrote "coupled with the characterisation and lines, it gives the film the feel of a Natural Life and that the tone, resembling a public service announcement, which the director chooses to tell this tale that plays spoilsport". A critic from Indiaglitz.com wrote "despite all its shortcomings, Ilai is a film needs to be lauded for its noble theme, realistic approach and the impactful portrayal of a rural girl’s struggle to get education".

References

External links
 

2017 films
2010s Tamil-language films
Indian drama films
2017 directorial debut films